Vulcana-Băi is a commune in Dâmbovița County, Muntenia, Romania with a population of 3,052 people. It is composed of three villages: Nicolaești, Vulcana-Băi and Vulcana de Sus.

The Orthodox , founded in 1654, is situated on the territory of the commune.

References

Communes in Dâmbovița County
Localities in Muntenia